Clepsis microceria is a species of moth of the family Tortricidae. It is found in Peru.

The wingspan is about 18 mm. The ground colour of the forewings is brown cream, suffused with brown and with brown dots and strigulae (fine streaks). The hindwings are grey-brown, but paler basally.

Etymology
The species name refers to the termination of the sacculus and is derived from Greek micros (meaning small), ceria or cerast (meaning horny) and the suffix -ia (expressing a similarity).

References

Moths described in 2010
Clepsis